The Done In 60 Seconds Award (abbreviated DISS) is an award presented annually by the British film magazine Empire to the winner of that year's Done In 60 Seconds Competition, in which participants recreate a known film in 60-seconds. The Done In 60 Seconds Award was first introduced at the 13th Empire Awards in 2008, with Nick Jesper from the United Kingdom receiving the award for his 60-second version of Titanic. The competition was open for its first two years only to entries from the United Kingdom and has since become an international competition with each participating country selecting its own local winner (or number of finalists) which then joins the global shortlist of films, from which a panel of judges selects the global winner.

The 2015 competition will be running in the following countries: Armenia, Brazil, Bulgaria, Greece, Kazakhstan, Poland, Russia, Serbia and the United Kingdom. The start date for the 2015 entries was October 29, 2014 at 12:00 and the closing date for entries will be January 31, 2015 at 23:59. The local winners will be showcased at the 20th Empire Awards on March 29, 2015 where a panel of judges will choose the Global Done In 60 Seconds winner.

Since its inception, the award has been given to five United Kingdom winners. Other winners include Kazakhstan and the Netherlands with one award each. David Smith from the United Kingdom is the most recent winner in this category for There Will Be Blood (Milk), his 60-second film version of There Will Be Blood.

Done In 60 Seconds competition

The Done In 60 Seconds competition was first introduced at the 13th Empire Awards in 2008, then open only to entries from the United Kingdom and it continued to be a United Kingdom only competition for its second appearance at the 14th Empire Awards in 2009. The competition was first opened to international entries at the 15th Empire Awards in 2010 and has since remained an international competition with eligible countries changing each year. The 15th Empire Awards also introduced The Global Final ceremony, where the shortlisted directors were invited to London where a group of judges chose the five finalist films. The Global Final was held for 5 consecutive award ceremonies between the 15th to 19th Empire Awards in 2014 and was discontinued at the 20th Empire Awards in 2015.

The 1st Done In 60 Seconds Competition Global Final was held on March 26, 2010 at 24 Club, London, England. The team of judges consisted of Empire editor-in-chief Mark Dinning, English actor Jason Issacs and English director Edgar Wright, which selected from a shortlist of 20 nominees the five Done In 60 Seconds Award finalists that were invited to the Empire Awards where the winner was announced.

The 2nd Done In 60 Seconds Competition Global Final was held on March 25, 2011 at the London Film Museum, London, England. The team of judges consisted of Empire editor-in-chief Mark Dinning, Irish actor and comedian Chris O'Dowd and English director Neil Marshall, which selected from a shortlist of 24 nominees the five Done In 60 Seconds Award finalists that were invited to the Empire Awards where the winner was announced.

The 3rd Done In 60 Seconds Competition Global Final was held on March 23, 2012 at the London Film Museum, London, England. The team of judges consisted of Empire editor-in-chief Mark Dinning, Sky Movies Premiere English presenter Alex Zane, Irish actor and comedian Chris O'Dowd and English director Gareth Edwards, which selected from a shortlist of 28 nominees the five Done In 60 Seconds Award finalists that were invited to the Empire Awards where the winner was announced.

The 4th Done In 60 Seconds Competition Global Final was held on March 22, 2013 at the Google Campus, London, England. The team of judges consisted of Empire editor-in-chief Mark Dinning, Bauer Media CEO Paul Keenan, Sky Movies Premiere, English presenter Alex Zane, Scottish radio DJ Edith Bowman and English actors Joanne Froggatt and Tom Hiddleston, which selected from a shortlist of 23 nominees the five Done In 60 Seconds Award finalists that were invited to the Empire Awards where the winner was announced.

The 5th Done In 60 Seconds Competition Global Final was held on March 29, 2014 at The Brewery, London, England. The team of judges consisted of Empire editor-in-chief Mark Dinning, Sky Movies Premiere English presenter Alex Zane, Scottish radio DJ Edith Bowman, Scottish director Jon S. Baird and English director Ben Wheatley, which selected from a shortlist of 24 nominees the five Done In 60 Seconds Award finalists that were invited to the Empire Awards where the winner was announced.

The 2014 competition was open to entries from 22 countries, including: Armenia, Bosnia, Brazil, Bulgaria, Croatia, Czech Republic, Greece, India, Israel, Kazakhstan, Portugal, Romania, Russia, Serbia, Ukraine and the United Kingdom.

Current competition

The 2015 competition will be running in the following countries: Armenia, Brazil, Bulgaria, Greece, Kazakhstan, Poland, Russia, Serbia and the United Kingdom. The start date for the 2015 United Kingdom entries was October 29, 2014 at 12:00 and the closing date for entries will be January 31, 2015 at 23:59. On February 20, 2015 a shortlist of 20 United Kingdom entries that the judging panel consider to be the most entertaining and technically competent entries will be published on the competition website with members of the public voting for their favorite film. The voting will close on March 6, 2015 and on March 13, 2015 the name of the most popular United Kingdom shortlist entry, based on the number of votes, will be chosen. As a change from previous years, there will not be a Global Final held where a panel of judges choose the 5 finalist films, instead the United Kingdom winner will join the other winners from the other participating countries and will be showcased at the 20th Empire Awards on March 29, 2015 where a panel of judges will choose the Global Done In 60 Seconds winner.

Winners and nominees
In the list below, winners are listed first in boldface, followed by the other nominees. The number of the ceremony (1st, 2nd, etc.) appears in parentheses after the awards year, linked to the article (if any) on that ceremony.

2000s

2010s

Notes
A: When there was a conflict regarding the director name between the Empire Awards official websites and the information provided in the film, the film information was chosen.
B: The official website for the 15th Empire Awards in 2010 only lists the United Kingdom nominees and finalists and not the global finalist list. The global finalist list was taken from an independent source.

Award statistics
The following countries received the Global Done In 60 Seconds award:

Done In 60 Seconds finalist films

2008 films

2009 films

2010 films

2011 films

2012 films

2013 films

2014 films

References

External links
 
 

Empire Awards
Film competitions